UiTM Football Club is a Malaysian professional football club based in Shah Alam, Selangor, Malaysia. The club last played in the Malaysia Super League. Founded in 2008, their home ground is 10,000-seater UiTM Stadium. The club widely known as The Lion Troops.

The team is under the jurisdiction of Universiti Teknologi MARA, a Malaysian public university based in Shah Alam, Selangor.

History
Founded in 2008, UiTM FC made club debut into Malaysian football by joining the third-tier league Malaysia FAM League in 2009. The club finishes third place in 2012 Malaysia FAM League and was promoted to the second-tier league, Malaysia Premier League in 2013 to replace USM FC, who were withdrawing from Malaysia Premier League due to financial difficulties.

On 25 July 2010, the club won the first edition of IPT League tournament by beating UKM FC 3–0 in the final at UiTM Stadium. UiTM FC's first goal was scored by Amirizdwan Taj before Fahrul Razi scored the second goal in the 37th minute. The third goal was an own goal by the UKM FC's Muhammed Suffian. Fahrul Razi was selected as the man of the match in the final.

During 2017 season, UiTM FC managed to qualify for the Malaysia Cup for the first time since the club's establishment. UiTM became the fifth teams from the Malaysia Premier League to qualify for the 2017 Malaysia Cup competition after the completion of the final fixtures in the first half of the season.

For 2019 season, UiTM FC managed to gain the fifth spot in the league. However, due to the status change of PKNS FC to the reserve team of Selangor FA, UiTM FC gains its promotion to play in the 2020 Malaysia Super League by default since Johor Darul Ta'zim II F.C. and Terengganu F.C. II were not allowed to play in the Malaysia Super League together with its parents club, Johor Darul Ta'zim F.C. and Terengganu F.C. It is the first time UiTM FC will play in the nation's top division league since its establishment.

UiTM's selection of players is somewhat unique in that the players, including import players, must undertake undergraduate courses in UiTM in order to be selected to the squad.

Players

First team squad

Former players
For details on former players, see :Category:UiTM FC players.

U21

U19

Club officials

Exco Member
 President: Prof Dr Azizan Abdullah
 Deputy President: Dr Mohd Bahrin Othman
 Secretary: Mustaza Ahmad
 Treasurer: Poazi Rosdi

Coaching staff

Coaches
Head coaches by years (2009–present)

Managerial history
Manager by years (2008–present)

Captain history
Captain by years (2010–present)

Achievements

Sponsorship

References

External links
 UiTM F.C. at Soccerway

UiTM FC
Malaysia Premier League clubs
Football clubs in Malaysia
University and college association football clubs
2008 establishments in Malaysia
Universiti Teknologi MARA
Association football clubs established in 2008